Nasīb is an Arabic literary form, 'usually defined as an erotic or amatory prelude to the type of long poem called a qaṣīdah.' However, although at the beginning of the form's development nasīb meant 'love-song', it came to cover much wider kinds of content: 'The nasīb usually is understood as the first part of the qaṣīdah where the poet remembers his beloved. In later ages the nasīb stood alone, and in that sense the meaning came to be understood as erotic and love poetry.'

Early and prominent examples of the nasīb appear in the Mu'allaqāt of the sixth-century poets Antarah ibn Shaddad and Imru' al-Qais. To quote from Imru' al-Qais's Mu'allaqah:

Stay! let us weep, while memory tries to trace
The long-lost fair one's sand-girt dwelling place;
Though the rude winds have swept the sandy plain,
Still some faint traces of that spot remain.
My comrades reined their coursers by my side,
And "Yield not, yield not to despair" they cried.
(Tears were my sole reply; yet what avail
Tears shed on sands, or sighs upon the gale?)

One prominent collection of self-standing nasībs (not included in a qaṣīdah) is Muḥyī al-Dīn Ibn al-ʿArabī's Tarjumān al-Ashwāq, a collection of sixty-one nasībs.

Further reading

 Jaroslav Stetkevych, The Zephyrs of Najd: The Poetics of Nostalgia in the Classical Arabic Nasīb (Chicago: University of Chicago Press, 1993)
 Jaroslav Stetkevych, 'Toward an Arabic Elegiac Lexicon: The Seven Words of the Nasīb', in Suzanne Pinckney Stetkevych, ed. Reorientations: Arabic and Persian Poetry (Bloomington, IN: Indiana University Press, 1994): 58-129.

References

 
Arab culture
Literary genres
Arabic and Central Asian poetics
Pakistani poetics
Arabic poetry forms
Love in Arabic literature